Menderes Samancılar (born 1 May 1954) is a Turkish actor.

Life and career
Samancılar was born on 1 May 1954 in Adana and is of Kurdish descent. He won the first prize in a photonovel competition organized by a newspaper in 1974. He starred in more than twenty photonovels within two years. He made his cinematic debut in 1975 with a role in Yılmaz Duru's movie İnce Memed Vuruldu. Until 1998 he appeared in more than 80 movie productions. In 1998, he was cast in Claude Lelouch's movie Hasards ou coïncidences. He subsequently continued his career in television. In 2005, he appeared on stage with Kerem Alışık and İpek Tuzcuoğlu in an adaptation of Selvi Boylum Al Yazmalım at Sadri Alışık Cultural Center. Samancılar ran for Adana's seat in the 1999 Turkish general election, representing the Freedom and Solidarity Party.

Samancılar started writing poems at the age of 15, and has published two poetry books: Sonbaharın Sarısını Vurdular Gece in 2003; and Yanmış Orman Kokusu in 2016. He has also expressed his inetersting in screenwriting.

Filmography 

 Yalı Çapkını (2022)
 Hükümsüz (2021)
 Zümrüdüanka (2020–2021)
 Güvercin (2019–2020)
 Kapı (2019)
 Çukur (2019)
 Babamın Kanatları (2016)
 Dar Elbise (2016)
 Urfalıyam Ezelden (2014)
 Kayıp (2012)
 Gözetleme Kulesi (2012)
 Hayat Devam Ediyor (2012)
 Bitmeyen Şarkı (2010)
 Asi (2009)
 Sarı Saten (Der gelbe Satin) (2008) - Galip Abi
 Hasret (2006) - Recep Dayı
 Rıza (2006)	
 Sıla (2006-2008) - Celil
 Düşler ve Gerçekler (2005) - Sadık
 O Şimdi Mahkum (2005) - Osman
 Kısmet (2004)
 Bütün Çocuklarım (2004) - Ahmet Kıroğlu
 Asmalı Konak - Hayat (2003) - Bekir Kirve
 Sır Çocukları (2002)
 Gönlümdeki Köşk Olmasa (2002) - İmam
 Yıldız Karayel (2002)
 Asmalı Konak (2002) - Bekir Kirve
 Derviş (2001) - Izak
 Vasiyet (2001) - Cambaz
 Sevgi Zamanı (2000)
 Halk Çocuğu (2000)
 Kumru (2000)
 Dilber (1999) - Arif Onbaşı	
 Bir Filiz Vardı (1998) - Filiz'in babası
 Hasards ou coïncidences (1998)
 Öldürme Üzerine Küçük Bir Film (1997)
 Ah Nalan Ah (1997)
 İlişkiler (1997)
 Yaban (1996)
 Kış Çiçeği (1996) - Mehmet Umut
 Kurtuluş (1996) - Topal Gazi
 Avrenos'un Müşterileri (1995)
 Mirasyediler (1995) - Tayfur
 Soğuk Geceler (1994) - Mahmut
 Alem Buysa (1994)
 Mavi Sürgün (1993)
 Öldüren Miras (1993)
 Gelincik Tarlası (1993)
 Dönersen Islık Çal (1992)
 Aliye (1992)
 Aysarının Zilleri (1992)
 Zıkkımın Kökü (1992)
 Piano Piano Bacaksız (1992) - Tevfik
 Krallığın Bedeli (1991)
 Siyabend-ü Xece (1991) - Siyabend'in amcası
 Robert'in Filmi (1990)
 Eskici ve Oğulları (1990)
 Karartma Geceleri (1990)
 Kiraz Çiçek Açıyor (1990)
 Darbe (1990)
 Aşkın Zamanı (1990)
 Cahide (1989)
 Gönüller Sultanı Mevlana (1989)
 İçimizden Biri: Yunus Emre (1989) - Derviş Yusuf
 Acı Şarkı (1989)
 Baharın Bittiği Yer (1989)
 Bu Talihimin Canına Okuyacağım (1988)
 Ağlamaya Değer Mi? (1988)
 Ayrı Dünyalar (1988)
 Tanrı Seni Korusun (1988)
 Yedi Uyuyanlar (1988)
 Sis (1988)
 Gramofon Avrat (1987)
 72. Koğuş (1987)
 Fikrimin İnce Gülü - Sarı Mercedes (1987)
 Biz Doğarken Gülmüşüz (1987)
 Yirmidört Saat (1987)
 Karınca Katar (1987)
 Zamansızlar (1987)
 Can Yoldaşım (1987)
 Bekçi (1986)
 Halkalı Köle (1986)
 Fatmagül'ün Suçu Ne (1986)
 Uzun Bir Gece (1986)
 Güneşe Köprü (1986)
 Gün Akşam Oldu (1986)
 Sevdan Öldürdü Beni (1986)
 Sıcak Tatlı Yaz (1986)
 Parmak Damgası (1985)
 Kaşık Düşmanı (1984)
 Aşk Sürgünü (1984)
 Beş Kafadar (1984)
 Severek Ayrılalım (1984)
 Geçim Otobüsü (1984)
 Bereketli Topraklar Üzerinde (1979)
 Derdim Dünyadan Büyük (1978)
 Kanal (1978)
 Azrailin Beş Atlısı (1978)
 Fırat'ın Cinleri (1977)
 Alçaktan Uçan Güvercin (1977)
 Hıdır (1977)
 Güneşli Bataklık (1977)
 İnce Memed Vuruldu (1975)
 Kara Çarşaflı Gelin (1975)
 Gecelerin Ötesi / İster Darıl İster Sarıl (1974)

Awards 
 1989 Antalya Golden Orange Film Festival, "Best Supporting Actor" (Sis)
 1993 Adana Golden Boll Film Festival, "Best Actor" (Zıkkımın Kökü)
 1993 Turkish Film Critics Association Awards, "Best Supporting Actor"
 1996 Orhon Murat Arıburnu Awards, "Best Actor"
 Contemporary Film Actors Association Awards, "Best Actor"
 19th Golden Boll Film Festival, "Best Supporting Actor" (Gözetleme Kulesi)
 23rd Golden Boll Film Festival, "Best Actor" (Babamın Kanatları)

References

External links 
 
 Profile at 
 "Helaaal Adanalı Mendo!", Celal Başlangıç, 6 March 1999, Radikal

1954 births
Turkish male film actors
Turkish male television actors
Turkish male stage actors
Best Supporting Actor Golden Orange Award winners
Living people